Rashid Browne (born 28 September 1993 in Rotterdam) is a Dutch professional footballer who plays as a winger.

Club career
Browne came through the Sparta Rotterdam youth system and joined Almere City in 2012. He is currently a free agent after leaving Romanian side Botoșani in January 2016.

References

External links
 Voetbal International profile 
 
 

1993 births
Living people
Footballers from Rotterdam
Association football wingers
Dutch footballers
Almere City FC players
FC Botoșani players
Excelsior Maassluis players
Valmieras FK players
Eerste Divisie players
Liga I players
Latvian Higher League players
Dutch expatriate footballers
Expatriate footballers in Romania
Dutch expatriate sportspeople in Romania
Expatriate footballers in Latvia